Stefanie Schneider (born 1968) is a German photographer living in Berlin and Los Angeles. Schneider's photographs exhibit the appearance of expired Polaroid instant film, with its chemical mutations. It has been released in books and exhibition catalogs, and in her feature film 29 Palms, CA (2014). Her work has also been used as the cover art for music by Red Hot Chili Peppers and Cyndi Lauper, and in the film Stay (2005).

Life and work
Schneider's preferred choice of location is the American West (especially Twentynine Palms, California, which served as location and title to one of her books), and the mounting of sequential images in a panel, the photographs evoke the impression of faded dreamy film stills. She holds an MFA in photography from the Folkwang Hochschule in Essen, Germany.

Schneider completed 29 Palms, CA in 2014. A feature film, art piece that explores the dreams and fantasies of a group of people who live in a trailer community in the Californian desert. The project includes six films: "Hitchhiker", "Rene's dream", "Sidewinder", "Till death do us part", "Heather's dream" and the feature film "The Girl Behind the White Picket Fence". A defining feature is the use of still Polaroid images in succession and voice over. Characters talk to themselves about their ambitions, memories, hopes and dreams. The latest of these short film is "Heather's dream", starring Heather Megan Christie and Udo Kier.

In a review of her book Stranger Than Paradise, Daniel Kothenschulte writes in the German magazine Literaturen that Schneider ". . . takes analog photographs and makes experimental movies with them. [. . . ] Even if most images remain connected to the genre of road movies—in one case one seems to get a glimpse of Ridley Scott's tragic runaways Thelma and Louise."

Schneider has made covers for the Red Hot Chili Peppers single "Desecration Smile" (2006) and Cyndi Lauper's Bring Ya to the Brink album (2008). She produced all the artwork in the 2005 film Stay directed by Marc Forster, for the character played by Ryan Gosling. The film's end credits were also made using expired Polaroid film.

Schneider plays the artist in the 2017 documentary film Instant Dreams by Willem Baptist.

Publications

Wastelands. Edition Braus, 2006. Edited by Thomas Schirmböck. . With essays by James Scarborough, Megan Mullally, Mark Gisbourne, and Renée Chabria. Edition of 50 copies
29 Palms, CA. 2004. . With an essay by Stefan Gronert, "The Greater The Emptiness The Grander The Art". Edition of 350 copies. Edited by Galerie Kämpf, Basel
Stranger Than Paradise. Hatje Cantz, 2006. Edited by Dominique A. Faix, Noëlle Stahel, and Daniela Bosshardt. . In German and English.
29 Palms, CA. Pocket Polaroid Series #004. Berlin: Schwarzer Freitag. .
Instantdreams. Pocket Polaroid Series #004. Avenso, 2014. .In German, English and French.

References

External links
 

1968 births
Living people
People from Cuxhaven
German contemporary artists
German women photographers
German artists